Cool Rider (originally titled Cool Rider Live) is a 2014 musical that was first performed only on 27 January 2014, at the Lyric Theatre, London. It was performed again later for one week only, 15 April – 19 April 2014, at the Duchess Theatre, in London. The musical was adapted from the 1982 film Grease 2.

Synopsis
Stephanie Zinone, leader of the Pink Ladies, has a romantic fling with English transfer student Michael Carrington. The only way she'll stay with him, however, is by him becoming a T-Bird.

Cast and characters
Five actors appeared in all performances as their character.

Lyric Theatre, London, 27 January 2014
The T-Birds
 Aaron Sidwell as Michael Carrington
 Niall Sheehy as Johnny Nogerelli
 Joshua Dowen as Louis DiMucci
 Kane Oliver Parry as Goose McKenzie
 Ben Stott as Davey Jaworski

The Pink Ladies
 Ashleigh Gray as Stephanie Zinone
 Hannah Levane as Paulette Rebchuck
 Bronté Barbé  as Sharon Cooper
 Evelyn Hoskins as Rhonda Ritter
 Dolores Rebchuck character does not appear

also
 Reece Shearsmith as Mr Stewart
 Nadine Cox as Ms Mason

Duchess Theatre, 15–19 April 2014
The T-Birds
 Aaron Sidwell as Michael Carrington
 Stewart Clarke as Johnny Nogerelli
 Joshua Dowen as Louis DiMucci
 Luke Fetherston as Goose McKenzie
 Harry Francis as Davey Jaworski

The Pink Ladies
 Ashleigh Gray as Stephanie Zinone
 Hannah Levane as Paulette Rebchuck
 Bronté Barbé as Sharon Cooper
 Lucinda Lawrence as Rhonda Ritter
 Dolores Rebchuck character does not appear

also
 Mark Benton as Mr Stewart
 Niki Evans as Ms Mason

Notable cast members

Musical numbers
Original Studio Cast Recording
(Released 29 June 2015)
 "Overture" – Cool Rider Band
 "Back to School" – Cast
 "Who's That Girl?" – Aaron Sidwell
 "Score Tonight" – Niall Sheehy & Cast
 "Mr Sandman" – Felipe Bejarano, Jack Feureisen, Rhys Owen, Rick Woska
 "Cool Rider" – Ashleigh Gray
 "Who's That Guy?" – Cast
 "Reproduction" – Reece Shearsmith & Company
 "Do It for Our Country" – Joshua Dowen, Bronté Barbé
 "Charades" – Aaron Sidwell
 "Prowlin'" – Niall Sheehy, Joshua Dowen, Mark Anderson, Daniel Buckley
 "Brad" – Jennifer Harding, Laura Hyde
 "Girl for All Seasons" – Ashleigh Gray, Hannah Levane, Bronté Barbé, Lucinda Lawrence
 "(Love Will) Turn Back the Hands of Time" – Ashleigh Gray, Aaron Sidwell
 "Rock-a-Hula-Luau (Summer Is Coming)" – Niki Evans & Cast
 "We'll Be Together" – Cast

References

External links
Official website

 
2014 musicals
Teen musicals
West End musicals